Fuhgeddaboudit, an eye dialect spelling of "forget about it," may refer to:

 Fuhgeddaboudit, a stereotypical phrase from New York City English, included in a list of Italian-American Mafia terminology
 Fuhgeddaboudit (Dark Angel episode)
 Fugget About It, a Canadian adult animated sitcom premiering in 2013